Brantford—Brant is a federal electoral district in Ontario, Canada, that has been represented in the House of Commons of Canada from 1904 to 1949 and since 1968.

Prior to the 2015 election, the riding was known as Brant.

History
The federal riding was first created in 1903 from parts of Brant South riding. It consisted of the County of Brant, excluding parts included in the Brantford riding.

In 1924, it was defined as consisting of the townships of Burford, South Dumfries, Onondaga, Tuscarora the part of the township of Brantford lying east of the Grand River, and the part of the city of Brantford not included in the electoral district of Brantford City. In 1933, it was expanded to include the town of Paris.

The federal electoral district was abolished in 1947 when it was redistributed between Brant—Wentworth and Brantford ridings.

The federal riding was recreated in 1966 from parts of Brant—Haldimand, Brantford and Haldimand—Norfolk—Brant ridings. It consisted initially of the County of Brant, and the Six Nations and New Credit Indian reserves.

In 1976, it was defined as consisting of the County of Brant. In 1987, it was defined as consisting of the City of Brantford, the Town of Paris, and the townships of Brantford and South Dumfries. In 2003, it was redefined as using the 1966 definition.

Brant was largely incorporated into the new riding of Brantford—Brant, with small territories going to Oxford and Cambridge during the 2012 electoral redistribution.

Demographics
''According to the Canada 2016 Census;

Ethnic groups: 78.3% European, 13.7% Indigenous, 2.6% South Asian, 1.7% Black 
Languages: 89.7% English, 1.3% Polish, 1.2% French, 1.0% Italian
Religions: 64.8% Christian (23.4% Catholic, 10.2% United Church, 9.0% Anglican, 5.1% Baptist, 3.3% Presbyterian, 2.5% Pentecostal, 1.1% Lutheran, 10.1% Other), 2.% Traditional Aboriginal Spirituality, 30.3% No religion 
Median income (2010): $28,981 
Average income (2010): $37,101

Members of Parliament

This riding has elected the following Members of Parliament:

Election results

Brantford—Brant, 2015–present

Brant, 1968–2015

Brant, 1904–1949

See also
 List of Canadian federal electoral districts
 Past Canadian electoral districts

References

Notes

External links
Federal riding history 1904-1949 from the Library of Parliament
Federal riding history 1968-2008 from the Library of Parliament
2011 results from Elections Canada
 Campaign expense data from Elections Canada

Politics of Brantford
Ontario federal electoral districts